Selside is a small village in Ribblesdale in North Yorkshire, England.

Selside was mentioned, in the form Selesat, in the Domesday Book, when it was held by Roger of Poitou.  The place name is derived from the Old Norse selja "willow" and sǽtr "mountain pasture" or "shieling".

Selside lies on the Settle to Carlisle railway line.  The Selside signal box, built in 1907, was moved in 1976 from the line to  Steamtown Carnforth in Lancashire.

References

External links

Villages in North Yorkshire
Ribblesdale